Rancid Aluminium is a 2000 film, based on a 1998 novel of the same name by James Hawes. It was released on 21 January 2000 to universally negative reviews, and is considered one of the worst films of all time.

Cast
Rhys Ifans
Joseph Fiennes
Tara FitzGerald
Sadie Frost
Steven Berkoff
Olegar Fedoro
Keith Allen
Dani Behr
Andrew Howard
Nick Moran
Brian Hibbard
Steve Speirs

Critical reception
Reviews of Rancid Aluminium were strongly negative. Peter Bradshaw of The Guardian said: "This film succeeds in getting its cast - some of the brightest and best of British character actors, young and old - to give the worst performances imaginable... The plot is all over the place, eventually incomprehensible, and very, very boring." Cosmo Landesman, writing in The Sunday Times also gave the film a negative review, describing the film as "a stupid, unfunny and self-satisfied film that should be avoided at all costs". Anne Billson of The Sunday Telegraph found the film confusing and derivative: "I couldn't even work out where the film is supposed to be set. Isn't that Portobello Road? Why is Tara Fitzgerald talking about Exeter? And how in hell did we get to this cricket pavilion? Director Ed Thomas appears to have been aiming for the Lock, Stock and Two Smoking Barrels crowd, but misses by several billion miles." Some years later, Hawes himself described his own adaptation as "a terrible screenplay".

Discussing Rancid Aluminium in an article on British cinema, Jacques Peretti gave an equally harsh assessment: "In many ways, Rancid Aluminium is beyond criticism because it is very hard, even after several viewings, to work out what the hell is going on" and that it was "incomprehensible and deeply lacklustre in all departments." Noting the film's negative reception, Peretti went on to argue: "By universal consent, it is the worst film ever made in the UK."

References

External links

 

1998 British novels
2000 films
2000s crime films
Films about the Russian Mafia
British novels adapted into films
Films based on British novels
British crime films
2000s English-language films
2000s British films